The Platinum Collection Volume 1: Shout to the Lord is a compilation praise and worship album of contemporary worship music by the Hillsong Church. The album appeared on the Billboard 200 and reached No. 8 on the Top Contemporary Christian Albums Chart.

Track listing
Disc 1:
 "People Just Like Us" (Russell Fragar; from People Just Like Us)
 "He's Real (All the Power You Need)" (Fragar; from Shout to the Lord)
 "My Redeemer Lives" (Reuben Morgan; from By Your Side)
 "Church On Fire" (Fragar; from Touching Heaven Changing Earth)
 "Joy in the Holy Ghost" (Fragar; from God Is in the House)
 "Show Me Your Ways" (Fragar; from Shout to the Lord)
 "I Will Run to You" (Darlene Zschech; from God Is in the House)
 "What the Lord has Done in Me" (Morgan; from By Your Side)
 "Jesus, You Gave it All" (Zschech; from Touching Heaven Changing Earth)
 "I Give You My Heart" (Morgan; from God Is in the House)
 "The Potter's Hand" (Zschech; from Touching Heaven Changing Earth)
 "Jesus, Lover of My Soul" (John Ezzy, Daniel Grul and Steve McPherson; from Shout to the Lord)
 "Dwelling Places" (Miriam Webster; from By Your Side)
 "The Great Southland" (Geoff Bullock; from The Power of Your Love)
 "Hear Our Praises" (Morgan; from Shout to the Lord 2000)

Disc 2:
 "All Things Are Possible" (Zschech; from All Things Are Possible)
 "I Believe the Promise" (Fragar; from God Is in the House)
 "Touching Heaven, Changing Earth" (Morgan; from Touching Heaven Changing Earth)
 "God Is in the House" (Fragar & Zschech; from God Is in the House)
 "This is How We Overcome" (Morgan; from By Your Side)
 "Your Love Keeps Following Me" (Fragar; from People Just Like Us)
 "Jesus What a Beautiful Name" (Tanya Riches; from God Is in the House)
 "The Power of Your Love" (Bullock; from The Power of Your Love)
 "Eagles Wings" (Morgan; from By Your Side)
 "And That My Soul Knows Very Well" (Zschech; from God Is in the House)
 "Shout to the Lord" (Zschech; from Shout to the Lord)
 "Love You So Much" (Fragar; from All Things Are Possible)
 "Holy Spirit Rain Down" (Fragar; from Touching Heaven Changing Earth)
 "So You Would Come" (Fragar; from All Things Are Possible)
 "You Said" (Morgan; from By Your Side)
 "Can't Stop Talking" (Fragar; from All Things Are Possible)
 "That's What We Came Here For" (Fragar & Zschech; from Touching Heaven Changing Earth)

References 

2003 compilation albums
Hillsong Music compilation albums